In mechanics, an  equilibrant force is a force which brings a body into mechanical equilibrium. According to Newton's second law, a body has zero acceleration when the vector sum of all the forces acting upon it is zero:

Therefore, an equilibrant force is equal in magnitude and opposite in direction to the resultant of all the other forces acting on a body. The term has been attested since the late 19th century.

Example 

Suppose that two known forces are pushing an object and an unknown equilibrant force is acting to maintain that object in a fixed position. One force points to the west and has a magnitude of 10 N, and the other points to the south and has a magnitude of 8.0 N. By the Pythagorean theorem, the resultant of these two forces has a magnitude of approximately 12.8 N, which is also the magnitude of the equilibrant force. The angle of the equilibrant force can be found by trigonometry to be approximately 51 degrees north of east.

References

External links 
 Equilibrium

Force